Sea Containers was a Bermudan registered company which operated two main business areas: transport and container leasing. It filed for bankruptcy on 16 October 2006. In 2009 its maritime container interests were transferred to a new company SeaCo Ltd.

History

Yale University graduate and retired United States Navy officer James Sherwood founded Sea Containers in 1965, with initial capital of $100,000. It was later listed on the New York Stock Exchange. In May 1989, UK-based Tiphook launched an unsuccessful takeover bid for the company.

Over 40 years, Sherwood expanded Sea Containers from a supplier of leased cargo containers, into various shipping companies, as well as expanding the company into luxury hotels and railway trains, including the Venice-Simplon Orient Express and the Great North Eastern Railway train operating company. Sherwood's net worth was estimated at £60million in the 2004 Sunday Times Rich List.

In 2005, Sea Containers sold its 25% share in Orient-Express Hotels.

Sherwood resigned from each of his companies in 2006 and was replaced by turnaround specialist Bob Mackenzie, while Ian Durant became senior vice-president of finance.

Chapter 11 
Despite selling various businesses and assets, Sea Containers announced in early October 2006 that it was unlikely to be able to pay a $115m (£62m) bond due on 15 October. On 16 October, the company filed for Chapter 11 bankruptcy protection.

On 6 November 2006 the Department for Work & Pensions wrote to Sea Containers that it must pay £143m into its two UK pension schemes if it wanted to wind them up.

On 11 February 2009, its maritime container interests were transferred to a new company SeaCo Ltd, with the wind-down and liquidation of the remainder of the group continuing. The major shareholders in the new company were the former Sea Containers Ltd bondholders and two of the group's UK pension funds.

Operations

Ferry services and related businesses
Isle of Man Steam Packet Company: fast and conventional services in the Irish Sea. Acquired in 1996, sold in 2003.
Silja Line: fast and conventional services in the Baltic Sea. In June 2006 Silja Line was purchased by Tallink, a ferry company from Estonia. The fast catamaran service SuperSeaCat was separated from Silja Line and operated until 2008 when it went bankrupt.
Orient-Express Hotels: (25% shareholding) sold in 2005
SeaStreak: following the Sea Containers bankruptcy of 2006, this operation was sold to New England Fast Ferry
SNAV-Hoverspeed: a joint venture with Italian ferry operator SNAV. Used the former Seacat Danmark as Zara Jet.
Aegean Speed Lines: a joint venture in Greece with the Eugenides Group. The service uses the former Hoverspeed Great Britain as Speedrunner 1, which operated in the English Channel and held the Hales Trophy and Blue Riband for the fastest crossing of the North Atlantic.
Hoverspeed: English Channel services ceased in 2005
SeaCat: (Belfast & Troon).

Other maritime
Hart Fenton: a naval architecture and marine engineering company, sold to Houlder in 2006
Sea Containers Chartering

Rail
GNER: a train operating company that commenced operating the InterCity East Coast franchise in April 1996. After winning a further 10-year extension when re-tendered in 2005, GNER ran into financial difficulties with Sea Containers handing back the franchise in December 2007. It also bid for the South Western franchise in 2001 and South Eastern franchise in 2006.

Containers 
The company's container leasing business was conducted mainly through GE SeaCo, a joint venture with GE Capital formed in 1998. GE SeaCo was sold to the HNA Group for approximately $1 billion on 15 December 2011 and now operates as Seaco.

Other former activities 
Sea Containers Property Services Ltd – property development, property asset management.
The Illustrated London News Group (ILNG) – publishing
Fruit farming – Sea Containers owned plantations in West Africa and South America
Fairways & Swinford – UK-based business travel agency

Former internet property of Sea Containers Ltd

In March 2016 the domain of seacontainers.com was acquired by World Sea Containers.

References

Companies formerly listed on the New York Stock Exchange
Companies that filed for Chapter 11 bankruptcy in 2006
Defunct companies of Bermuda
Shipping companies of Bermuda
Container shipping companies
Transport companies established in 1965
1965 establishments in Bermuda